King Muhammad Fareed Didi (Al'amīru Muḥanmadu Farīdu Dīdī) , (January 11 1901 – May 27 1969), the son of the Sultan Prince Abdul Majeed Didi (Al Munthakhab Liarshi Dhaulathil Mahaldheebiyya), was the last Sultan of Maldives and the first Maldivian monarch to assume the title of "King" with the style of "His Majesty". He was the Sultan of the Maldives from March 7, 1954, until November 11, 1968. He was deposed in 1968 from the throne when Maldives became a republic, and died the following year in Maldives.

Early years

He studied at Royal College Colombo in Ceylon. After spending 7 years in Ceylon (Sri Lanka), he came back and became the prime minister of Sultan Hassan Nooraddine II on December 16, 1932. He served as the speaker of People's Majlis from 1933 to 1942.

Reign

After the fall of President Mohamed Amin Didi, a referendum was held and the country was again declared a Sultanate. A new People's Majilis was elected, as the former "People's Majilis" was dissolved after the end of the revolution. The members of the special majilis decided to take a secret vote to elect a Sultan, and Prince Mohammed Fareed Didi was elected as the 84th Sultan in 1954. His first Prime Minister was Ehgamugey Ibraahim Ali Didi (later Ibraahim Faamuladheyri Kilegefaan). On December 11, 1957, the Prime Minister was forced to resign and Velaanagey Ibrahim Nasir was elected as the new Prime Minister the following day.

On November 15, 1967, a vote was taken in parliament to decide whether the Maldives should continue as a constitutional monarchy or become a republic. Of the 44 parliamentarians, forty voted in favour of a republic. On March 15, 1968, a national referendum was held, in which 81.23% of the votes cast favoured establishing a republic. The republic was declared on November 11, 1968, thus ending the 853-year-old monarchy.

Post-deposition and death

After his deposition from the throne, the King left the royal palace and retired to his own residence (Maabagychaage, now the parliament house) in Henveiru ward. He died on May 27, 1969, in Malé. He was given a state funeral and was buried in the Galolhu Cemetery.

References

1901 births
1969 deaths
20th-century sultans of the Maldives
Prime Ministers of the Maldives
Alumni of Royal College, Colombo
People from Malé
Honorary Knights Commander of the Order of St Michael and St George
Maldivian Muslims
Speakers of the People's Majlis
Dethroned monarchs